Lick Creek Township may refer to the following places in the United States:
 Lick Creek Township, Davis County, Iowa
 Lick Creek Township, Van Buren County, Iowa
 Lick Creek Township, Ozark County, Missouri

Township name disambiguation pages